IVAO may refer to:

Ivao Group
International Virtual Aviation Organisation, an online flight-simulation network